Polo returned to the Olympic program at the 1936 Summer Olympics in Berlin, after not being contested at the 1928 Games or 1932 Games. The 1936 tournament was the last time that the sport was contested at the Olympic Games. Argentina repeated as champions, winning gold medals in both of the Games in which the nation competed. Great Britain took silver; British polo players had earned medals in all five of the Olympic polo tournaments (including as members of mixed teams in 1900). Mexico took bronze, matching its previous performance in 1900.

Background

This was the fifth and final time that polo was played at the Olympics; the sport had previously appeared in 1900, 1908, 1920, and 1924. Each time, the tournament was for men only. For 72 years, polo had the distinction of being the last sport to be removed from the Olympic programme; baseball/softball took that position after the 2008 Games.

Argentina and the United States were the top two polo-playing nations in the world. The 1924 Olympic tournament had come down to a 6–5 Argentine victory to determine the gold medal; the United States beat Argentina in 1928 and 1932 Cup de las Americas during years in which the sport was not contested at the Olympics. Earlier in 1936, however, Argentina had taken the Cup over the United States. The Americans did not send a team to Berlin, leaving Argentina the heavy favorites at the 1936 Games.

Germany and Hungary each made their debut in polo in 1936. Great Britain made its fifth appearance; it was the only nation to compete in all five editions of the Olympic polo tournament. Argentina and Mexico each made their second appearance.

Competition format

The tournament used an ad hoc format deliberately designed to create a final between the recognized strongest teams in the tournament, Argentina and Great Britain. The hosts, as well as Hungary, were not even given an opportunity to contend for the gold medal, with the teams separated into divisions. 

The first three matches were set to pit Mexico against first Great Britain and then Argentina in the top division, and Germany against Hungary in the lower division. If, as expected, Mexico lost both games, the match between Great Britain and Argentina would be the gold medal final. The winner between Germany and Hungary would play Mexico for the bronze medal.

Medalists

Note: The International Olympic Committee medal database shows only these players as medalists. They all played at least one match during the tournament. The reserve players are not listed as medalists.

Participating nations
Each country was allowed to enter one team of 8 players and they all were eligible for participation.

A total of 21(*) polo players from 5 nations competed at the Berlin Games:

 
 
 
 
 

(*) NOTE: Only players who participated in at least one game are counted.

Only a few reserve players are known.

The organizers also invited United States and India, but those nations declined to send teams.

Results

 Group A

 Group B

 Bronze medal match

 Final

Summary

References

 

1936 Summer Olympics events
1936
1936 in polo
Men's events at the 1936 Summer Olympics